Strange People is a 1969 Soviet drama film directed by Vasily Shukshin.

Plot 
The film consists of three short stories, the main characters of which are strange people who live in a village and have a rich inner world.

Cast 
 Vsevolod Sanayev as Matvey Ivanovich Ryazantsev
 Panteleymon Krymov as Veniamin Zakharovich Dulich, history teacher
 Sergei Nikonenko as Vasya
 Elena Sanayeva as Ryazantsev's daughter
 Nina Sazonova as Ryazantsev's wife
 Yevgeny Yevstigneyev as Vasya's brother
 Lidiya Fedoseyeva-Shukshina as Lidiya  Nikolaevna 
 Maria Shukshina as Mashenka
 Yevgeni Lebedev as Bronislav Ivanovich Pupkov
 Lyubov Sokolova  as Alyona,  Pupkov's wife
  Viktor Avdyushko as  collective farm chairman

References

External links 
 

1969 films
1960s Russian-language films
Soviet drama films
1969 drama films
Films directed by Vasily Shukshin
Gorky Film Studio films
Russian anthology films
Soviet black-and-white films